Rosario del Tala is a city in the center-south of the province of Entre Ríos, Argentina. It lies on the western banks of the Gualeguay River, 179 km east-southeast from the provincial capital Paraná and 118 km due west from Colón.

A populated settlement existed in the area already in the 1750s, but the town was officially founded on 7 July 1863 by decree of governor Justo José de Urquiza.

References
 
 Rosario del Tala at TurismoEntreRios.com.

sur de entre rios

Populated places in Entre Ríos Province
Populated places established in 1863
1863 establishments in Argentina